Leoš Janáček Airport Ostrava , formerly Ostrava-Mošnov International Airport, is the airport of the city of Ostrava in the Czech Republic, a major economic and industrial centre. The airport was renamed in December 2006 after Leoš Janáček, a Czech composer, musical theorist, folklorist, publicist, and teacher born in Hukvaldy, Moravia.

NATO Days in Ostrava, a military air show, has been an event at the airport since 2003.

History 
The first passenger airport in Ostrava was Ostrava-Hrabůvka airport that served flights to Prague from 1935 until 1959. The airfield in Mošnov originates from 1959. The Prague route was relocated to the new airport at that year. The airport served as air base for the Czech Air Force until 1989. Beginning in 1989, after the airport was placed under ČSL control, the airport was used by holiday charter operators.

The majority of passenger flights to land in Ostrava were charter flights to Mediterranean destinations in Tunisia, Spain and Bulgaria. The flights were sporadic during the summer months. The airline Air Ostrava (successor to Air Vítkovice) had a base in Ostrava since 1994. Air Ostrava opened routes to Verona, Amsterdam and Ljubljana. The airline collapsed in 2000, leaving the airport without a base carrier.

In 1997, Czech leisure airline Fischer Air owned by the travel and tourism company Fischer commenced a seasonal flights to Antalya, Burgas Gran Canaria, Heraklion, Hurghada, Ibiza, Mallorca, Monastir, Rhodes, Split and Tenerife until the collapse of the airline in 2005 meant the discontinuation of the routes to Canary Islands.

Facilities
Leoš Janáček Airport Ostrava is at an elevation of 844 feet (257 m) above mean sea level. It has one concrete runway: 04/22 is 11,519 by 207 feet (3,511 x 63 m). There are numerous hangars east of Runway 04/22. There is a large, full service aircraft modification and maintenance facility opened in 2008 on the north side of the airport. The maintenance facility was subsequently expanded in 2020 at a cost of CZK380 million. It has space under the roof for 2 more 737-size aircraft. The airport is open 24 hours daily. As well as being able to serve aircraft as large as an Antonov An-225, the airport has a heliport that allows it to serve helicopters, alongside fixed-wing aircraft. Due to its distance from the city centre, there are no noise restrictions enforced at the airport.

Construction of a new terminal started in July 2005. It cost CZK 320 million (about 10.66 million EUR) and opened on 13 December 2006. A new railway station  from the international airport terminal was opened in 2015.

Operations 
In January 2023, typical commercial passenger traffic included Boeing 737s, Embraer 170s and Embraer 175s models. Currently, LOT Polish Airlines operates the Embraer 170 and 175 to OSR. Ryanair utilizes Boeing 737s for all flights. LOT Polish Airlines formerly operated flights to Warsaw on the Dash 8-Q400 aircraft (which was the only scheduled passenger service to OSR on turbo-prop aircraft). Numerous airlines operate daily flights to Leipzig/Halle using the Boeing 737s and Boeing 757s models on behalf of DHL. Swiftair also operates daily flights to Cologne/Bonn using the ATR-42 twin-turboprop aircraft on behalf of United Parcel Service. Uzbekistan Airways operates their Boeing 767-300F; while SkyTaxi uses their Boeing 767-200F, these are the only wide-body aircraft to routinely use the airport. Numerous other aircraft are used for frequent charter flights.

Terminal 

OSR currently has two terminal buildings. The newer one was opened on December 13, 2006, and is used for departures. The arrival hall referred to the former 1959 terminal, was in use for both departing and arriving passengers until 2006.

Departure Hall 
The new terminal officially opened for business on December 13, 2006. The departure hall, consists of six gates in two levels: A1–A3 and B1–B3. Lower level, which consists of gates: A1–A3 is used by Ryanair and Smartwings for flights outside the Schengen Area. It contains customs facilities capable of processing departure international aircraft. Upper level, which consists of gates: B1–B3 is used by LOT Polish Airlines and Smartwings. Flights to destinations within the Schengen Area operate from these gates. Gate B2 also contains customs facilities capable of processing departing Ryanair flights to London.

Arrival Hall 
Former terminal building was the only concourse at the airport in operation and in use from 1959 until 2006. It contains customs and Immigration facilities capable of processing arriving international aircraft. The arrival hall has baggage claim facilities, airport baggage office and rental car offices. Passengers arriving from destinations within Schengen Area proceed through one-way doors into the main arrival hall. For international arrivals, the doors are closed, forcing deplaning passengers through different one-way doors and a corridor. The corridor leads into the customs an immigration facility. After being processed, passengers proceed into the main arrival hall.

Airlines and destinations

Passenger

The following airlines operate regular scheduled and seasonal flights to and from Ostrava:

Cargo

Statistics

Ground transport

Road 
The airport is located close to the Road I/58 from Rožnov pod Radhoštěm to Ostrava and European route E462. Airport also offers valet parking and a meet-and-greet service.

Bus 
There are regular bus services directly linking the airport with Ostrava, Dubina (line 670), Ostrava, ÚAN (line 333), Ostrava, Sad Boženy Němcové (line 331) and Nový Jičín (line 670). It is possible to pay by a credit card on the bus. The 670 bus service link the airport with Ostrava, Dubina calling at a number of local areas along the journey before arriving at Ostrava.

Rail 
Mošnov, Ostrava Airport Railway station is situated next to the terminal building. Services to Ostrava are on the České dráhy train to and from Ostrava-Svinov in Ostrava-Poruba and furthermore to and from Ostrava hlavní nádraží (The Main train station). Ostrava-Svinov is served by the tram, local bus services, coach services offering access throughout Ostrava and the neighbourhoods. Ostrava hlavní nádraží is served by the tram, trolleybuses and also by the coach services.

See also
 List of airports in the Czech Republic

References

External links

 Official website
 
 

Airport
Ostrava
Airport
Buildings and structures in the Moravian-Silesian Region
International airports in the Czech Republic
1959 establishments in Czechoslovakia
Airports established in 1959
20th-century architecture in the Czech Republic